Indian honorifics are honorific titles or appendices to names used in the Indian subcontinent, covering formal and informal social, commercial, and religious relationships. These may take the form of prefixes, suffixes or replacements.

Native honorifics
Honorifics with native/indigenous Hindu-Buddhist origin.

Hindu-Sikh honorifics

List of titles

 Abhyasi
 Acharya
 Aasaan
 Ayya
 Baba
 Babu
 Bhagavan
 Bhagat
 Bhai
 Chhatrapati
 Chakravarti, Chakraborty
 Chettiar, suffix denoting a man's wealth
 Chitnis one of the most important and highest-ranking ministers in a court.

 Choudhury
 Chempakaraman
 Das, a common surname on the Indian subcontinent which has also been applied as a title, signifying "devotee" or "votary" (in the context of religion); also, Dasa
 Devi
 Deshmukh
 Dvija
 Gain or Gayen
 Gossain
 Guru
 Jagadguru
 Jagirdar
 Kothari
 Kumari
 Kunwar, Kumar
 Mahamandaleshwar
 Mahant
 Maharaj, Maharaja, Maharajadhiraj
 Mahātmā
 Maharani
 Maharishi, Maharshi
 Mahayogi, Mahayogini
 Mankari
 Mantrik
 Melshanthi
 Muni
 Naidu
 Naicker
 Nayak
 Pandit
 Patil
 Patlin
 Paramahamsa
 Paramguru
 Prabhu
 Pujari
 Raj
 Raidu, Raja, Rai, Rana, Rao, Rawal, Rawat
 Rajarshi
 Rajguru
 Rajkumar, Maharajkumar
 Rajkumari, Maharajkumari
 Rani
 Reddy
 Rishi
 Rishi Mudgal
 Sādhaka
 Sadhu
 Sain or Saeen
 Samanta, 'vassal'
 Samrat, 'emperor'
 Sannyasin
 Sardar
 Sarpatil
 Satguru, Sadguru
 Sawai
 Singh
 Sethi, Sheth, suffixes denoting a man's wealth
 Shankaracharya
 Shaunaka
 Shishya
 Sri (also Shri, Shree)
 Shrimati
 Swami
 Thakur
 Thiru or Thirumathi
 Yogi, Yogini
 Yuvraj
 Veer

Secular profession-specific honorifics
 Lambardar
 Patwari
 Pandit
 Zamindar
 Ghatwal
 Mulraiyat
 Pradhan
 Jagirdar
 Mustajir
 Zaildar
 Talukdar
 Thikadars

Influence on other cultures

With the expansion of Indosphere cultural influence of Greater India, through transmission of Hinduism in Southeast Asia and the Silk Road transmission of Buddhism leading to Indianization of Southeast Asia with non-Indian southeast Asian native Indianized kingdoms adopting Sanskritization of their languages and titles as well as ongoing historic expansion of Indian diaspora has resulted in many overseas places having Indianised names (e.g. Sanskritised naming of people, Sanskritised naming of places, Sankritised institutional mottos, Sanskritised educational institute names), architecture, martial arts, music and dance, clothing, and cuisine.

Please help expand the following partial list of Indian influenced honorifics:
 Burmese honorifics and Burmese Buddhist titles
 Cambodia honorifics
 Cham honorifics
 Filipino styles and honorifics
 Indonesian honorifics
 Khmer honorifics
 Lao honorifics
 Malay styles and titles
 Sinhala honorifics
 Thai royal ranks and titles

Maratha honorifics

Associated with the Maratha Kingdom or general Marathi-speaking population.
 Kshatriyakulavatans
 Chhatrapati
 Maharaj
 Maharani
 Peshwa
 Peshwin
 Sardar
 Deshmukh
 Sarpatil
 Patil
 Patlin
 Rao
 More Maratha titles

Sikh honorifics

 Sardar
 Sardarni
 Giani

Middle East honorifics

 Amir
 Badshah
 Bahadur
 Beg
 Begum
 Darogha
 Dastur / Dastoor
 Ghazi
 Hazrat
 Khan or Khatoon for females
 Khaqan
 Mahaldar
 Mansabdar
 Mir
 Mirza
 Sahib
 Shah and Shahanshah
 Shahzada
 Sultan
 Syed
 Taluqdar
 Ustad

See also

 Honorary titles of Indian leaders
 Currently official honors:
 Indian honours system
 Awards and decorations of the Indian Armed Forces
 Battle and theatre honours of the Indian Army
 India Style (manner of address)
 Past or unofficial honors:
 English honorifics
 Order of British India

References

External links

Honorifics by country
Indosphere
Titles and occupations in Hinduism
Honorifics by language